Wo/Men's Alliance for Medical Marijuana (WAMM) is a not-for-profit medicinal cannabis dispensing collective located in Santa Cruz, California.  WAMM was founded in 1993 by Valerie Leveroni Corral and her then-husband Michael Corral. Valerie Corral is also the Executive Director of Raha Kudo: Design for Dying Project, a non-profit corporation that provides education and research to support persons facing death and their caregivers. Members of WAMM receive organic medicinal cannabis at cost while volunteers trade work for cannabis.  There is a compassion program for those unable to afford the full cost of medical cannabis. WAMM was the first medical marijuana collective to receive non-profit status from the United States Government.

Early days
In 1973, a small airplane swooped down and scraped Valerie Corral's car, sending her "skidding, rolling and bouncing 365 feet through the dust, brush and rocks." As a result of the accident, Corral suffered injuries that led to ongoing issues such as brain damage, epilepsy, and severe migraines. Despite taking prescription drugs, Corral continued to experience convulsions, shaking, and grand mal seizures. Corral's husband Michael suggested that she try cannabis after he read in a medical journal that marijuana controlled some seizures in mice. She found that regular use of marijuana helped alleviate her symptoms.

In 1992, the Corrals were arrested by the local sheriff for the cultivation of five marijuana plants. She became the first patient in California to challenge existing law while using the defense of necessity for medical marijuana. Prosecutors dismissed the case, claiming they were unlikely to win the case in front of a sympathetic jury in liberal Santa Cruz. After the sheriff arrested the Corrals again one year later, the district attorney stated he had no intention of ever prosecuting them and requested law enforcement agencies to leave the couple alone. In 1993 the Wo/Men's Alliance for Medical Marijuana, (WAMM) was formed.

Valerie Corral was a key-player in the crafting, and passage of, Proposition 215 – also known as the Compassionate Use Act of 1996 – which allowed patients with a doctor's recommendation to use marijuana medicinally. WAMM became the first medical marijuana collective to be granted not-for-profit status in the United States.

WAMM has been called the most legitimate medical marijuana collective and cooperative in the nation.

While distribution was supported by local authorities, who also offered assistance in preventing theft, federal authorities maintained that growing, using, and distributing marijuana was illegal. To provide legal protection, Santa Cruz deputized the Corrals in 2000 to act as medical marijuana providers.

Members
According to WAMM, many members have either a terminal or serious illness. Between the years 1993 and 2010, 223 members of WAMM died.  In 2009, WAMM director Valerie Corral stated that the collective had roughly 24 minors members.

Hospice care
Corral founded a hospice care center for patients who use medical marijuana to alleviate symptoms associated with various terminal diseases and conditions. She has provided personal care and comfort to hundreds of individuals during their palliative care, including Laura Huxley, with whom she was a close personal friend. Close to 200 WAMM members have died since the group's conception. Valerie Corral has been by the bedside of most.

DEA raid
On September 5, 2002, federal agents from the Drug Enforcement Administration (DEA) raided the WAMM garden weeks prior to their annual harvest, arrested the Corrals, and destroyed all of the collective's medicinal marijuana plants, (150 plants). The Corrals were detained and later released. The government never filed charges, though the Corrals decided to challenge the federal ban with assistance from Santa Clara University law professor Gerald Uelmen and advocates at the Drug Policy Alliance.

The raid was condemned by many high profile individuals, including then-California Attorney General Bill Lockyer, former Vice Mayor of Santa Cruz Emily Rielly, and all the members of the Santa Clara County Board of Supervisors that were serving at the time.

Several weeks later, WAMM handed out medical marijuana on the steps of city hall in Santa Cruz, California. WAMM members, (whose illnesses include multiple sclerosis, cancer, and AIDS), came out in support of their organization. Many protests and media articles followed the raid, and the DEA received unfavorable worldwide media attention as a result of the raid against the terminally ill.

Post raid
Despite the raid in 2002, Valerie and Mike Corral continue to operate WAMM out of Santa Cruz. Valerie played a key role in drafting SB 420, which expanded many definitions and provisions for patients in California.

Support from City of Santa Cruz
The City of Santa Cruz has been explicitly supportive of WAMM and its activities.  Following the 2002 raid, WAMM was permitted to dispense medicinal cannabis to its members on the steps of City Hall. In 2003, in solidarity with the collective, the City of Santa Cruz sued the federal government for raiding WAMM and the case is referred to as Santa Cruz v. Mukasey.

Judge Fogel's rulings
In 2004, Federal Judge Jeremy Fogel denied the government's motion to dismiss the Plaintiff's (WAMM's) complaint.  This ruling allowed WAMM to continue cultivating medicinal cannabis while the lawsuit was pending. In 2008, Judge Fogel ruled in favor of WAMM in Santa Cruz v. Mukasey.  Fogel used reasoning from the earlier Conant v. Walters rulings to partially guide his decision.  The Conant decision stated, "Applied to our situation, this means that, much as the federal government may prefer that California keep medical marijuana illegal, it cannot force the state to do so."

Lawsuits and court cases
Valerie Corral has been at the forefront of several lawsuits against the government. The most recent court case is County of Santa Cruz v. Mukasey, in which the City and County of Santa Cruz signed on with WAMM to sue the federal government.

Judge Jeremy Fogel allowed discovery for the plaintiffs, which allowed WAMM's lawyers to ask the federal government very specific questions in regard to their enforcement of California's medical marijuana laws. An American Civil Liberties Union (ACLU) press release stated the following:

In a first-of-its-kind ruling, a federal court today held that the U.S. Constitution bars deliberate subversion by the federal government of state medical marijuana laws.

Corral was also involved with Conant v. Walters, County of San Diego v. San Diego NORML, and Craker v. DEA.

In 2009, the DEA denied a request by Professor Craker, Corral, and MAPS to end the federal government's monopoly on medical marijuana production and research. A corresponding ACLU press release stated:

The Bush administration struck a parting shot to legitimate science today as the Drug Enforcement Administration (DEA) refused to end the unique government monopoly over the supply of marijuana available for Food and Drug Administration (FDA)-approved research. DEA's final ruling rejected the formal recommendation of DEA Administrative Law Judge (ALJ) Mary Ellen Bittner, issued nearly two years ago following extensive legal hearings.

In January 2010, WAMM dismissed their lawsuit against the federal government. WAMM counsel Allen Hopper cited a 2009 policy change in the Obama Administration that gave the Justice Department more discretion with regard to medical marijuana raids.

Reactions
A WAMM attorney, Gerald Uleman spoke with CBS News and stated that "representing Valerie Corral, for me, is like representing Mother Teresa," and he called her "one of the most compassionate people I've ever met." Drug Policy Alliance director Ethan Nadelmann also likened Corral to Mother Teresa.

Driving fatality 
A WAMM volunteer caused a fatal accident after leaving a WAMM site in 2010.  The woman whose car he hit died at the scene, and her baby was injured but survived.  The volunteer, an artist who had started a support group for WAMM members with chronic pain, died the next day.  Police reported that he said, at the scene of the accident, that he had used marijuana "just prior to the collision".  Family members said that it was impossible to be certain of the collision's cause, because the volunteer's vehicle had some mechanical problems and he had several health problems, such as sleep apnea, that could have caused or contributed to it.

See also

 Brownie Mary
 Cannabis in California
 Legal history of cannabis in the United States
 Medical cannabis
 Removal of cannabis from Schedule I of the Controlled Substances Act

References

External links
 
 

1993 in cannabis
Cannabis in California
Feminist organizations in the United States